Woodcroft is a surname. Notable people with the surname include:

Bennet Woodcroft (1803–1879), British textile manufacturer
Chris Woodcroft (born 1965), Canadian educator and wrestler
Craig Woodcroft (born 1969), Canadian professional ice hockey head coach
Jay Woodcroft (born 1976), Canadian former professional ice hockey player
Nikki Woodcroft (born 1996), Canadian women's field hockey player